Dahongmennan station is a station on Line 8 of the Beijing Subway. It was opened on December 30, 2018.

Station Layout 
The station has an underground island platform.

Exits 
There are 3 exits, lettered A, B, and C. Exit C is accessible.

References 
 Beijing Subway official map, showing official English name

Beijing Subway stations in Fengtai District
Railway stations in China opened in 2018